Black Note were an American jazz ensemble formed in 1991. The band released four albums, on Columbia Records, Impulse! Records, Red Records and World Stage.

They won first prize at the John Coltrane Young Artist Competition in 1991.

Discography
 43rd & Degnan (World Stage, 1991)
 L.A. Underground (Red, 1993)
 Jungle Music (Columbia, 1994)
 Nothin' But The Swing (Impulse!, 1996)

Group members
Marcus Shelby - bass
Willie Jones III - drums
Eric Reed - piano
Kenneth Crouch - piano
Ark Sano - piano
Richard Grant - trumpet
Gilbert Castellanos - trumpet
James Mahone - alto sax
Phil Vieux - tenor sax
Robert Stewart - tenor sax

Guest musicians
Greg Kurstin - piano
Nicholas Payton - trumpet
Teodross Avery - tenor sax, soprano sax

References

Columbia Records artists
Impulse! Records artists
American jazz ensembles
Red Records artists